The 2018 New York City FC season is the club's fourth season of competition and its fourth in the top tier of American soccer, Major League Soccer. New York City FC plays its home games at Yankee Stadium in the New York City borough of The Bronx.

Roster

Player movement

In 
Per Major League Soccer and club policies, terms of the deals do not get disclosed.

Out

Loans 
Per Major League Soccer and club policies, terms of the deals do not get disclosed.

In

Out on loan

Draft picks

Results

Preseason and Friendlies

Major League Soccer season

League tables

Eastern Conference

Overall

Results summary

Matches

MLS Cup Playoffs

U.S. Open Cup

Player statistics

Appearances and goals

|-
! colspan=14 style=background:#dcdcdc; text-align:center|Goalkeepers

|-
! colspan=14 style=background:#dcdcdc; text-align:center|Defenders

|-
! colspan=14 style=background:#dcdcdc; text-align:center|Midfielders

|-
! colspan=14 style=background:#dcdcdc; text-align:center|Forwards

|-
|}

References

New York City FC seasons
New York City FC
New York City FC
New York City FC